The 1952 Segunda División Peruana, the second division of Peruvian football (soccer), was played by 10 teams. The tournament winner, Unión Callao, was promoted to the Primera División Peruana 1953.

Results

Standings

External links
 La Historia de la Segunda 1952

 

Peruvian Segunda División seasons
Peru2
2